Gondal is a town in Attock District of Punjab Province in Pakistan on the N-5 National Highway Grand Trunk Road. Gondal has the biggest cattle market of Attock District.

References

Cities and towns in Attock District